Gladys Enti  (born 21 April 1975) is a Ghanaian women's international footballer who plays as a goalkeeper. She is a member of the Ghana women's national football team. She was part of the team at the 1999 FIFA Women's World Cup, 2003 FIFA Women's World Cup and 2007 FIFA Women's World Cup. On club level she plays for Ghatel Ladies in Ghana.

References

1975 births
Living people
Ghanaian women's footballers
Ghana women's international footballers
Place of birth missing (living people)
2007 FIFA Women's World Cup players
Women's association football goalkeepers
2003 FIFA Women's World Cup players
1999 FIFA Women's World Cup players